Moksha, the annual cultural festival of Netaji Subhas University of Technology (NSUT), started in 2003. It is organised in March. Moksha is a three-day national cultural extravaganza held at NSUT every even semester of the academic year of the college, with the most popular events being Hasya-Kavi Sammelan, FahreChoreography, Fashion show, Pop Show, Rock Show and the Star Night amongst others. It is considered to be one of the biggest cultural fests of New Delhi and attracts sponsorships from top corporate houses of India like TCS, Intel and Airtel. The fest is attended by colleges from all over India and has enjoyed the presence of big names from within and across borders, like Edward Maya, KK, Akcent, and Strings, the Pakistani band.

Popularity
Moksha involves participation from many colleges from all over India, making it one of the largest college festivals in north India. Some of the events are also featured on popular TV and radio channels creating a large outreach.
Every year Moksha witnesses a footfall of more than 50,000 at events and competitions that are covered by both print and electronic media. There are a plethora of competitions organised witnessing participation from all over Delhi University to IIMs. There is activity, drama and vivaciousness at every nook and cranny of the campus during the three-day festival. The mega events – "Mudra" and "Rouge" – undergo various rounds of selection to cherry-pick the best four for the finale from a multitude of dynamic participants. The theatre – fest attracts teams from colleges all over DU, be it Hindu, Ramjas or Maitreyi. The popularity of the fest can be measured by the fact – MTV as Media Partner, with Video Jockey Gaelyn covering various events. This further leads to the soaring popularity of Moksha amongst the youth. The recent presence of Akcent in 2014 had people thronging the campus from every corner of Delhi. It is not an event – it is an experience!. With the conversion of this institute into university, the popularity of the fest is expected to increase exponentially.

Main Attractions

A list of key events organized in Moksha :

 Pro Night
 Fahrenite (Pop Nite)
 Avalanche - The Rock Show
 Humour Fest
 Mudra - The Choreography Competition
 Oorja - The Western Dance Competition
 Street Dance
 Folk Dance
 Theatre Fiesta
 TNT - Battle of Bands
 Dhwani – The Music Competition
 Rouge - The Fashion Parade
 Mr. & Mrs. Moksha
 NukkadNatak
 KaviSamellan
 Film Making

Avalanche – the rock show – is one of the best and grandest rock shows in India. The 50000 Watts deafening sound maddening thousands plus crowd. Fahrenite-the star night – has witnessed soulful voices of KK, Mohit Chauhan, Salim–Sulaiman in recent years. Rouge- the fashion show – is the perfect amalgamation of flamboyance, glitz and elegance. Art Exhibition, Insomania- the jam, and virtual arena are other major highlights.

Other Mega events like Mudra-the choreography competition, the youth parliament competition, Oorja -the dance competition and bhangra competition witnessed overwhelming participation and vibrant crowd. Events like 'soch', and 'parwaaz'- drama competitions, witness massive crowds and are known for entertaining the crowd.

Sports events like T-20 cricket, table tennis, football, volleyball, and lawn tennis pump up the adrenaline rush. Natyamanch-theatre fiesta competition witnessed some amazing plays and performances.

Other events like debates, Dhwani-vocals Hindi and English both, Night's Watch, Quiz competitions, Indradhanush, dramatics competition, and street dance competition witnessed an attendance of many with people cheering at the top of their voices. Recently, TVF of YouTube fame graced the occasion and set the stage on fire.

Fahrenhite
Pop Night, the most popular event.
 2003 – KK
 2006 – Ali Azmat
 2007 – Kailash Kher
 2008 – Jal
 2009 – Mohit Chauhan
 2010 – Javed Ali, Bohemia (rapper)
 2011 – Strings
 2012 – KK
 2013 – Sunburn Campus
 2014 – Akcent
 2015 – Edward Maya, Sachin–Jigar, Nucleya
 2016 – Shaan, Tomorrowland DJ's, Zaeden, Nina & Mallika
 2017 - Jasleen Royal
2018 - Monali Thakur
2019 - Salim–Sulaiman
2022- KK

References

External links
 Official website
 Facebook Page
 Instagram Page
 NSUT Delhi

College festivals in India